Klajdi Kuka (born 29 March 1990) is an Albanian professional footballer who plays as a goalkeeper for Laçi in the Kategoria Superiore.

Club career
Kuka made his debut for KF Tirana at the age of 18 on the last day of the 2007–08 season against Kastrioti Krujë. Failing to break through into the first team he was loaned out to Albanian First Division side Tomori Berat in January 2010 for 12 months.

He then again moved on loan to Bylis Balsh in the Albanian Superliga in February 2011 until the remainder of the season. Once he returned to Tirana he was again loaned out to Tomori Berat on 29 August 2011 for the entire 2011–12 season, but he returned to his parent club early on 10 January 2012.

Kuka scored his professional goal on 14 May 2016 in Tërbuni Pukë's 2–1 home loss to Kukësi, netting from his own zone with a long kick which downfielded deceived Enea Koliçi.

In July 2017, Kuka completed a transfer to Kastrioti Krujë in the Albanian First Division for the 2017–18 season. On 1 August 2018, he signed a new one-year contract ahead of the 2018–19 season. Later on 24 December, the club announced the termination of the contract with the goalkeeper by mutual consent.

In January 2019, Kuka returned in First Division by joining FK Vora on a six-month deal.

On 5 July 2022, Laçi announced to have signed Kuka on a deal for the 2022–23 season.

Personal life
Kuka is a longlife fan of KF Tirana, the club in which he started his career.

References

External links

1990 births
Living people
Footballers from Tirana
Albanian footballers
Association football goalkeepers
KF Tirana players
FK Tomori Berat players
KF Bylis Ballsh players
KF Tërbuni Pukë players
KS Kastrioti players
FK Vora players
KS Turbina Cërrik players
FK Dinamo Tirana players
KF Besa Kavajë players
Kategoria Superiore players
Kategoria e Parë players
Albanian expatriate footballers
Albanian expatriate sportspeople in Germany
Expatriate footballers in Germany